Consuelo Clark-Stewart (July 22, 1860 – April 17, 1910) was the first African American woman to practice medicine in Ohio.

For twenty years she had a thriving practice in Youngstown, where she treated Black and white patients. She was the daughter of Peter H. Clark, who is considered the first Black socialist, and the wife of William R. Stewart, one of the first Black attorneys and elected representatives in Ohio.

Early life 
Clark was born in Ohio in 1861, one of three children of Peter H. Clark and Frances Ann Williams Clark. She graduated from Gaines High School in Cincinnati in 1879.

Career 
After high school, Clark studied medicine privately with Dr. Elmira Y. Howard, the first woman physician in Cincinnati. She then obtained a place at Boston University School of Medicine, graduating in 1884 after earning the highest honors on her final exams. She returned to Ohio where she worked at the Ohio Hospital for Women and Children. In 1890, she married the up-and-coming Black attorney William R. Stewart. Thereafter she referred to herself as Dr. Consuelo Clark-Stewart. She relocated with her husband to Youngstown, Ohio. She set up a private practice in medicine where she treated Black and white patients.

In Youngstown, Clark-Stewart was active in the YWCA and in setting up free kindergartens.

Death 
Clark-Stewart died on April 17, 1910, at the Massillon State Hospital of pernicious anemia. According to press reports, Clark was also mentally ill and had been judged insane.

References 

Boston University School of Medicine alumni
1861 births
1910 deaths
African-American women physicians
Physicians from Ohio
People from Youngstown, Ohio
19th-century American women physicians
19th-century American physicians
Deaths from pernicious anemia
20th-century American women physicians
20th-century American physicians